The 2007 Nigerian Senate election in Benue State was held on 21 April 2007, to elect members of the Nigerian Senate to represent Benue State. David Mark representing Benue South, George Akume representing Benue North-West and Joseph Akaagerger representing Benue North-East all won on the platform of the Peoples Democratic Party.

Overview

Summary

Results

Benue South 
The election was won by David Mark of the Peoples Democratic Party.

Benue North-West 
The election was won by George Akume of the Peoples Democratic Party.

Benue North-East 
The election was won by Joseph Akaagerger of the Peoples Democratic Party.

References 

April 2007 events in Nigeria
Benue State Senate elections
Ben